The Air Rescue Wing Nyutabaru Detachment is a unit of the Air Rescue Wing of the Japan Air Self-Defense Force. It is also known as the Nyutabaru Air Rescue Squadron. Responsible for airborne search and rescue, it is based at Nyutabaru Air Base in Miyazaki Prefecture. It is equipped with UH-60J and U-125A aircraft.

Tail markings
Detachment UH-60J aircraft do not have special markings. JASDF aircraft usually have unit markings on their tail, but U-125A aircraft of the Air Rescue Wing have a marking on their fuselage, usually with a sticker below showing which base they are assigned to.

Aircraft operated
 UH-60J
 U-125A

References

Units of the Japan Air Self-Defense Force